Lively Grove Township is a township in Washington County, Illinois. As of the 2010 census, its population was 688, and it contained 294 housing units.

The township is home to the Prairie State Energy Campus. It was first settled by survivors of the Lively massacre.

Geography

Demographics

References

External links
City-data.com
Illinois State Archives

Townships in Washington County, Illinois
Townships in Illinois